De Bouches à Oreilles is the fourth album and the first live album released by French reggae band Tryo. The band have sold more than 900,000 albums worldwide.

Track listing
CD1 ("A L'Olympia") :

 "Dans Les Nuages" (6:11)
 "G8" (3:54)
 "Con Par Raison" (4:50)
 "Cogema" (5:02)
 "Awham (Intro)" (1:59)
 "Si La Vie M'a Mis Là" (4:57)
 "Serre-Moi" (5:12)
 "Pour Un Flirt Avec La Crise" (4:59)
 "La Main Verte" (2:58)
 "Comme Les Journées" (3:54)
 "Yakamoneyé" (8:53)
 "Pompafrik (Les Nouvelles Colonies)" (10:46)
 "Vacances Au Texas (Intro)" (4:07)
 "Maux De Bush" (3:48)

CD2 ("Au Cabaret Sauvage"):

 "Les Extrêmes" (4:10)
 "La Révolution" (4:37)
 "Sortez-les" (4:35)
 "Plus On En Fait" (3:56)
 "Tous En Boite - Armstrong" (2:23)
 "Monsieur Bibendum" (3:24)
 "Paris" (8:00)
 "Récréaction" (5:02)
 "La Misère D'en Face" (6:53)
 "La Première Fois" (4:20)
 "Désolé Pour Hier Soir" (7:10)
 "C'est Du Roots" (5:15)
 "L'Hymne De Nos Campagnes" (4:13)

References

Tryo albums
2004 live albums